The 2007–08 KFC Twenty20 Big Bash was the 3rd season of the official Twenty20 domestic cricket in Australia. Six teams representing six states in Australia  participated in the competition. The competition began on 31 December 2007 when the Queensland Bulls took on two-time champions the Victorian Bushrangers at the new Tony Ireland Stadium in Thuringowa.  Another match between the Western Warriors and the previous year's finalists the Tasmanian Tigers was held on the same day at the WACA Ground.

This season comprised 15 regular matches, instead of twelve from the 2006–07 season.  This allowed each team to play every other team once.

Table

Teams received 2 points for a win, 1 for a tie or no result, and 0 for a loss. The top two teams, Western Australia and Victoria, played in the final at the WACA Ground in Perth. These two teams also qualified for the 1st edition of the Champions Twenty20 League, expected to be hosted by India in December 2008.

Teams

Fixtures

Final

Statistics

Highest Team Totals

Most Runs

Highest Scores

Most Wickets

Best Bowling Figures

Player of the Series
David Hussey, Victorian Bushrangers

External links
 Cricinfo – KFC Twenty20 Big Bash Match List
 Cricinfo – KFC Twenty20 Big Bash Statistics

See also

 Pura Cup season 2007-08
 Ford Ranger One Day Cup season 2007-08
 Australian cricket team in 2007-08

KFC Twenty20 Big Bash seasons
KFC Twenty20 Big Bash
Domestic cricket competitions in 2007–08